is a railway station in the city of Nagaoka, Niigata, Japan, operated by East Japan Railway Company (JR East).

Lines
Tsukayama Station is served by the Shin'etsu Main Line and is 55.8 kilometers from the terminus of the line at Naoetsu Station.

Station layout
The station consists of two ground-level opposed side platforms connected by a footbridge, serving three tracks, with the middle track not in use for passenger traffic. The station is unattended.

Platforms

History
Tsukayama Station opened on 27 December 1897.  With the privatization of Japanese National Railways (JNR) on 1 April 1987, the station came under the control of JR East. The station building was severely damaged by the 23 October 2004 2004 Chūetsu earthquake and was replaced in 2005.

Passenger statistics
In fiscal 2014, the station was used by an average of 210 passengers daily (boarding passengers only).

Surrounding area
Tsukayama Post Office

See also
 List of railway stations in Japan

References

External links

 JR East station information 

Railway stations in Nagaoka, Niigata
Railway stations in Japan opened in 1897
Shin'etsu Main Line
Stations of East Japan Railway Company